Fern Emmett (March 22, 1896 – September 3, 1946) was an American film actress. She appeared in 212 films between 1930 and 1946. Emmett's film debut came with Universal in a two-reel production in 1914.

Personal life
Emmett was married to actor Henry Roquemore.

Death
Emmett died in Hollywood, California. Her remains are interred at Forest Lawn Memorial Park in Glendale, California.

Selected filmography

 Second Honeymoon (1930)
 Romance of the West (1930)
 Westward Bound (1930)
 West of Cheyenne (1931)
 Rider of the Plains (1931)
 Ten Nights in a Bar-Room (1931)
 Dynamite Denny (1932)
 Bridge Wives (1932)
 Hollywood Luck (1932)
 Hollywood Lights (1932)
 Love in High Gear (1932)
 East of Fifth Avenue (1933)
 Riders of Destiny (1933)
 Blue Steel (1934)
 Terror of the Plains (1934)
 Loser's End (1935)
 Big Calibre (1935)
 Behind the Green Lights (1935)
 The E-Flat Man (1935)
 Texas Terror (1935)
 Rainbow Valley (1935)
 The Oregon Trail (1936)
 Three on a Limb (1936)
 Ticket to Paradise (1936)
 The Trail of the Lonesome Pine (1936)
 Riders of the Whistling Skull (1937)
 Overland Stage Raiders (1938)
 Goodbye Broadway (1938)
Hidden Enemy (1940)
 Scattergood Baines (1941)
 Love Crazy  (1941)
 Cinderella Swings It (1943)
 Dead Men Walk (1943)
 Johnny Doesn't Live Here Any More (1944)
 San Diego, I Love You (1944)

References

External links

 
 

1896 births
1946 deaths
American film actresses
Actresses from New York (state)
Deaths from cancer in California
20th-century American actresses

Burials at Forest Lawn Memorial Park (Glendale)
Western (genre) film actresses